The women's 200 metres event at the 1994 Commonwealth Games was held on 25 and 26 August at the Centennial Stadium in Victoria, British Columbia.

Medalists

Results

Heats

Wind:Heat 1: +1.2 m/s, Heat 2: +2.6 m/s, Heat 3: +2.2 m/s, Heat 4: +2.4 m/s

Semifinals
Wind:Heat 1: +1.4 m/s, Heat 2: +2.7 m/s

Final
Wind: +1.3 m/s

References

200
1994
1994 in women's athletics